Dalila Spiteri (born 24 April 1997) is an Italian tennis player.

Spiteri has a career-high WTA singles ranking of 434, achieved on 27 September 2021. She also has a career-high WTA doubles ranking of 419, reached on 5 August 2019.

Spiteri made her WTA Tour main-draw debut at the 2019 Palermo Ladies Open, in the doubles draw, partnering Federica Bilardo.
She started 2020 season by winning three $15k tournaments (one in singles and two in doubles) in February.

ITF Circuit finals

Singles: 3 (2 titles, 1 runner-up)

Doubles: 13 (5 titles, 8 runner–ups)

References

External links
 
 

1997 births
Living people
Italian female tennis players
21st-century Italian women